Glenn D. Ennis (born May 19, 1964 in Vancouver, British Columbia, Canada) is a former Canadian national rugby player.

Ennis played a total of 32 games for Canada, including 3 as captain. He played in the mid to late 1990s in Japan for Suntory.

In his second career, Ennis works as an actor and stuntman in the motion picture and television industry. He played the role of a vicious grizzly bear in the 2015 Western film The Revenant.

References

External links 
Scrum.Com
https://www.imdb.com/name/nm1029283/
Glenn Ennis Stunts

1964 births
Living people
Canada international rugby union players
Canadian male film actors
Canadian expatriate sportspeople in Japan
Canadian people of Scottish descent
Canadian rugby union players
Canadian sportspeople in doping cases
Canadian stunt performers
Sportspeople from Vancouver
University of British Columbia alumni
Rugby union number eights